Adrienne Jablanczy (born 11 September 1948) is a French economist, professor and, since 1997, Executive Director of the Institut supérieur européen de gestion group.

Biography 
Jablanczy graduated from the Pantheon-Sorbonne University and the Institut d'Études Politiques de Paris. Jablanczy started her career in 1976 as a monetary economics and monetary theory teacher at Panthéon-Assas University. At the time, she was responsible for economics training at the European Business School Paris (EBS). In 1980, she became the  head of training EBS. In 1997, she was nominated Director of the ISEG. She is also a financial markets teacher at the École Nationale Supérieure des Télécommunications de Bretagne.

Jablanzcy specializes in management of business schools, financial markets, Islamic finance and sovereign wealth funds. She is the author of La Bourse (The Stock Exchange) and, with Philippe Beraud, Crise et Variables d’Ajustement des États Méditerranéens, in May 2010.

Bibliography
 Adrienne Jablanczy, La Bourse, Marabout, 1991, 
 Adrienne Jablanczy and Philippe Beraud, Crise et variables d’ajustement des États méditerranéens, Management & Avenir, ISSN 1768-5958, May 2010

References 

French economists
French women economists
Sciences Po alumni
Heads of universities in France
Living people
1949 births
Women heads of universities and colleges